Brandy is a feminine given name.

People
 Brandie Burton (b. 1972), an American professional golfer
 Brandy Johnson (b. 1973), an American gymnast and stuntwoman
 Brandy Ledford (b. 1969, an American actress and model
 W. T. "Brandy" McCain (1913-1993), an American politician
 Brandy Norwood (b. 1979), an American singer and actress also mononymously known as Brandy
 Brande Roderick (b. 1974), an American model and actress
 Greg "Brandy" Alexander (b. 1965), an Australian rugby league player
 Jim "Brandy" Brandstatter (b. 1949/1950), an American football player and broadcaster

Fictional characters
 Brandy Alexander, a major character in the 1999 novel Invisible Monsters by Chuck Palahniuk
 Brandy Harrington, a title character of the animated television series Brandy & Mr. Whiskers
 Brandi, the character portrayed by Nia Long in the 1991 film, Boyz n the Hood
 Brandy-Lynn, Cosmo's Ex-Girlfriend from The Fairly OddParents: Fairly Odder

See also
 Brandi, a given name or surname

References

English feminine given names